Punta Negra may refer to:
 Punta Negra District, Peru
 Punta Negra Dam, Argentina
 Punta Negra, Uruguay

See also
 Ponta Negra, Natal, Brazil
 Ponta Negra, Manaus, Brazil
 Pointe-Noire, Republic of the Congo